Honda Performance Development, Inc. (HPD) is a subsidiary of American Honda Motor Co. which was established in 1993 and is based in Santa Clarita, California. It is the technical operations center for Honda's American motorsports programs and is involved in the design and development of race engines and chassis for auto racing series such as the IndyCar Series, American Le Mans Series (ALMS), European Le Mans Series (ELMS), FIA World Endurance Championship (WEC) and IMSA SportsCar Championship.

IndyCar racing
HPD debuted in the CART IndyCar World Series as a works engine manufacturer in 1994. During their first season in 1994, they scored a podium at Toronto, while in 1995 they scored their first victory at New Hampshire. In 1996, HPD won its first manufacturers' and drivers' championships after taking 11 wins from 16 races. HPD took six consecutive drivers championships' as it won the drivers' title again in 1997, 1998, 1999, 2000 and 2001, while it won the manufacturers' title again in 1998, 1999 and 2001.

In 2003, HPD moved to the IRL IndyCar Series. In 2004, HPD overwhelmingly dominated the IndyCar Series by winning 14 of 16 races, including the Indianapolis 500, and claiming the manufacturers' and drivers' championship titles. The 2005 season was similarly successful as the company took its second Indy 500 victory and won 12 races to win the manufacturers' and drivers' crowns. From 2006 to 2011, HPD was the sole engine manufacturer of the IndyCar Series, including the Indianapolis 500. During this period, the Indianapolis 500s were run without any engine failures for the first six times in Indy 500 history, while no race failures occurred in the entire 2008, 2010 and 2011 seasons.

Manufacturer competition returned to the series in 2012, and HPD has constructed turbocharged V6 engines for its effort. Since then, HPD has won the Indianapolis 500 in 2012, 2014, 2016, 2017, 2020, 2021, and 2022, the drivers' championship in 2013, 2018, 2020, and 2021, and the manufacturers' championship in 2018, 2019, 2020, and 2021.

Sports car racing
In 2006, Honda through its Acura brand, announced its plans to develop a Le Mans Prototype program for the ALMS, competing in the LMP2 class for the initial year of competition in 2007. The new car, called Acura ARX-01a, was a homologated development of chassis from Courage with a new 3.4 liter V8, the maximum size allowed by the rules being developed by HPD. This was the first V8 ever branded as an Acura and the first racing Honda engine built entirely outside Japan. Elements of the Acura V8 dubbed the AL7R, share similar architecture with the Honda engine used in the Indy Racing League although none of the parts are interchangeable. In 2010 Honda dropped the Acura name in favor of HPD and the car is now known as the HPD ARX-01.

 ARX-01
 ARX-02
 ARX-03
 ARX-04b
 ARX-05
 ARX-06

In 2007, HPD supplies Vemac RD320R and Vemac RD408R for GT300 cars in Super GT Series with designation C32B.

For the 2012 racing season, HPD decided to forgo having a works team and instead focus on being a chassis and engine provider. 2012 also saw HPD return to the premier class of racing, LMP1, in the Le Mans and FIA World Endurance Championship series.

FIA World Endurance Championship 

American Le Mans Series 

IMSA SportsCar Championship 

For 2017, HPD will leave the Daytona Prototypes class of the IMSA SportsCar Championship, as the Acura NSX will compete at the IMSA SportsCar Championship and Pirelli World Challenge with technical support from HPD.

For 2018, HPD will return to the Prototype class of the IMSA SportsCar Championship, as the ARX-05 will compete at the IMSA SportsCar Championship with technical support from HPD.

References

External links

 Honda Performance Development official website

Honda
Official motorsports and performance division of automakers
Santa Clarita, California
Honda in motorsport
American racecar constructors